The 106th Pennsylvania House of Representatives District is located in South Central Pennsylvania and has been represented since 2017 by Tom Mehaffie.

District profile
The 106th Pennsylvania House of Representatives District is located in Dauphin County. It is made up of the following areas:

 Conewago Township
 Derry Township
 Hummelstown
 Lower Swatara Township
 Middletown
 Royalton
 Swatara Township (PART)
 District 02
 District 05
 District 06
 District 08 
 District 09

Representatives

Recent election results

References

External links
District map from the United States Census Bureau
Pennsylvania House Legislative District Maps from the Pennsylvania Redistricting Commission.  
Population Data for District 106 from the Pennsylvania Redistricting Commission.

Government of Dauphin County, Pennsylvania
106